Judd Hill is an unincorporated community in Poinsett County, Arkansas, United States. The Judd Hill Cotton Gin, which is listed on the National Register of Historic Places, is located in Judd Hill. Judd Hill was named for banker and businessman Orange Judd Hill, who founded the community.

References

Unincorporated communities in Poinsett County, Arkansas
Unincorporated communities in Arkansas